The 2011 season was Daejeon Citizen's fifteenth season in the K-League in South Korea. Daejeon Citizen competed in K-League, League Cup and Korean FA Cup.

Current squad

Match results

K-League

League table

Results summary

Results by round

Korean FA Cup

League Cup

Squad statistics

Appearances and goals
Statistics accurate as of match played 30 October 2011

Top scorers

Top assistors

Discipline

Transfer

In
 9 November 2010 –  Park Kun-Young – Yeungnam University (Draft)
 9 November 2010 –  Hwang Hun-Hee – FC Metalurh Zaporizhya (Draft)
 9 November 2010 –  Jeong Yeon-Woong – Daejeon Citizen Youth (Draft)
 9 November 2010 –  Jeong Gyu-Jin – Sangji University (Draft)
 9 November 2010 –  Jeon Sang-Hoon – Yonsei University (Draft)
 9 November 2010 –  Kim Jin-Man – Sunmoon University (Draft)
 9 November 2010 –  Kim Do-Yeon – Yewon Arts University (Draft)
 9 November 2010 –  Lee Myeong-Cheol – Inje University (Draft)
 9 November 2010 –  Lee Sang-Hee – Hongik University (Draft)
 9 November 2010 –  Lee Woong-Hee – Pai Chai University (Draft)
 12 July 2011 –  Noh Yong-Hun – Busan I'Park
 28 July 2011 –  Kim Young-Bin – Incheon United (transfer)
 28 July 2011 –  Jeon Bo-Hoon – Incheon United (transfer)
 28 July 2011 –  Kim Tae-Yeon – Tokyo Verdy
 28 July 2011 –  Kang In-Jun – Jeju United
 28 July 2011 –  Lee Sang-Hyup – Jeju United (loan)
 28 July 2011 –  Yuta Baba – Tokyo Verdy
 28 July 2011 –  Choi Hyun-Bin – FC Seoul (loan)
 21 September 2011 –  Kim Ji-min – Sangju Sangmu Phoenix (military service end)
 21 September 2011 –  Yoon Sin-Young – Sangju Sangmu Phoenix (military service end)
 21 September 2011 –  Lee Je-Kyu – Sangju Sangmu Phoenix (military service end)
 21 September 2011 –  Kwak Chul-Ho – Sangju Sangmu Phoenix (military service end)
 14 October 2011 –  Yoo Min-Chul – National Police Agency FC (military service end)

Out
 November 2010 –  Ou Kyoung-Jun (FW) – FC Seoul (loan end)
 November 2010 –  Ko Ki-Gu (FW) – Pohang Steelers (loan end)
 November 2010 –  Alexandre (MF) – Free agent (contract end)
 November 2010 –  Zacarias (DF) – Free agent (contract end)
 November 2010 –  Ko Myung-Sik (DF) – Free agent (contract end)
 November 2010 –  Lee Joon-Keun (GK) – Free agent (contract end)
 November 2010 –  Jeon Dong-Min (MF) – Free agent (contract end)
 November 2010 –  Kim Gyung-Do (DF) – Free agent (contract end)
 November 2010 –  Lee Seung-Mok (MF) – Free agent (contract end)
 November 2010 –  Kim Sang-Duk (MF) – Free agent (contract end)
 November 2010 –  Ko Dae-Woo (MF) – Free agent (contract end)
 November 2010 –  Kwon Hyuk-Jin (DF) – Free agent (contract end)
 November 2010 –  Hwang Ji-Yoon (DF) – Sangju Sangmu Phoenix (military duty)
 November 2010 –  Lee Jong-Chan (DF) – Sangju Sangmu Phoenix (military duty)
 November 2010 –  Jung Hyung-Joon (DF) – National Police Agency FC (military duty)
 November 2010 –  Kim Dae-Wook (DF) – National Police Agency FC (military duty)
 November 2010 –  Lee Seung-Won (DF) – National Police Agency FC (military duty)
 17 June 2011 –  Park Sang-Wook (MF) – Released (contract terminated)
 17 June 2011 –  Kim Ba-Woo (MF) – Released (contract terminated)
 17 June 2011 –  Sin Jun-Bae (GK) – Released (contract terminated)
 17 June 2011 –  Yang Jung-Min (DF) – Released (contract terminated)
 17 June 2011 –  Kwak Chang-Hee (FW) – Released (contract terminated)
 17 June 2011 –  Kang Gu-Nam (MF) – Released (contract terminated)
 17 June 2011 –  Lee Jung-Won (DF) – Released (contract terminated)
 17 June 2011 –  Lee Myeong-Cheol (DF) – Released (contract terminated)
 12 July 2011 –  Hwang Jae-Hun (DF) – Busan I'Park (transfer)
 12 July 2011 –  Wésley Brasilia – Free Agent
 28 July 2011 –  Kim Han-Seob – Incheon United (transfer)
 28 July 2011 –  Bai Zijian – Released

References

South Korean football clubs 2011 season
2011